The 1955 College Football All-America team is composed of college football players who were selected as All-Americans by various organizations and writers that chose College Football All-America Teams in 1955. The eight selectors recognized by the NCAA as "official" for the 1955 season are (1) the All-America Board (AAB), (2) the American Football Coaches Association (AFCA), (3) the Associated Press, (4) the Football Writers Association of America (FWAA), (5) the International News Service (INS), (6) the Newspaper Enterprise Association (NEA), (7) the Sporting News (SN), and (8) the United Press (UP).

Consensus All-Americans
For the year 1955, the NCAA recognizes eight published All-American teams as "official" designations for purposes of its consensus determinations. The following chart identifies the NCAA-recognized consensus All-Americans and displays which first-team designations they received.

All-American selections for 1955

Ends
Ron Beagle, Navy  
Ron Kramer, Michigan  
Howard Schnellenberger, Kentucky 
Joe Walton, Pittsburgh 
Rommie Loudd, UCLA 
Harold Burnine, Missouri 
Tom Maentz, Michigan 
John Paluck, Pittsburgh 
Bill Walker, Maryland 
Joe Tuminello, LSU 
Jim Katcavage, Dayton 
Dave Howard, Wisconsin 
Henry Gremminger, Baylor 
Menan Schriewer, Texas

Tackles
Norm Masters, Michigan State 
Bruce Bosley, West Virginia  
Sam Huff, West Virginia  
John Witte, Oregon State 
Frank D'Agostino, Auburn 
Mike Sandusky, Maryland 
Paul Wiggin, Stanford  
Herb Gray, Texas 
Phil Tarasovic, Yale 
Francis Machinsky, Ohio State 
Carl Vereen, Georgia Tech 
Roger Siesel, Miami (Ohio) 
Fred Robinson, Washington 
John Jankins, Arizona State

Guards
Bo Bolinger, Oklahoma 
Cal Jones, Iowa (Outland Trophy and College Football Hall of Fame) 
Hardiman Cureton, UCLA 
Jim Parker, Ohio State 
Tony Sardisco, Tulane 
Pat Bisceglia, Notre Dame 
Scott Suber, Mississippi State 
James D. Brown, UCLA 
Orlando Ferrante, USC 
Buck Nystrom, Michigan State 
Jim Buonopane, Holy Cross 
William Meigs, Harvard 
Franklin Brooks, Georgia Tech 
Bryan Burnthorne, Tulane

Centers
Bob Pellegrini, Maryland 
Hugh Pitts, Texas Christian 
Jerry Tubbs, Oklahoma (College Football Hall of Fame) 
Ken Vargo, Ohio State 
Steve DeLatorre, Florida

Quarterbacks
Earl Morrall, Michigan State  
George Welsh, Navy  
Claude Benham, Columbia

Halfbacks
Howard Cassady, Ohio State  
Paul Hornung, Notre Dame  
Jim Swink, TCU  
Jon Arnett, Southern California 
Tommy McDonald, Oklahoma 
Art Davis, Mississippi State 
Ed Vereb, Maryland 
Jim Brown, Syracuse 
Gary Glick, Colorado A&M 
Sam Brown, UCLA 
Charley Horton, Vanderbilt 
Fob James, Auburn 
Lenny Moore, Penn State (Pro Football Hall of Fame) 
Charley Sticka, Trinity 
Paige Cothren, Mississippi 
Bob Pascal, Duke

Fullbacks
Don Schaefer, Notre Dame 
Joe Childress, Auburn 
Bob Davenport, UCLA 
Jerry Planutis, Michigan State

Key
 Bold – Consensus All-American
 -1 – First-team selection
 -2 – Second-team selection
 -3 – Third-team selection

Official selectors
 AAB = All-America Board
 AFCA = American Football Coaches Association, for Collier's Weekly magazine
 AP = Associated Press
 FWAA = Football Writers Association of America
 INS = International News Service: selected based on "recommendations of INS football experts from coast-to-coast with the assistance of coaches, scouts, broadcasters and newspaper sports editors."
 NEA = Newspaper Enterprise Association: All-Americans selected by the NEA received "solid gold Longines-Wittnauer watches, handsome and specially designed certificates and, perhaps best of all, testimonial dinners in their old home towns."
 SN = Sporting News
 UP = United Press

Other selectors
 CP = Central Press Association
 Jet - Jet magazine
 NBC - National Broadcasting Co.
 WC - Walter Camp Football Foundation

See also
 1955 All-Atlantic Coast Conference football team
 1955 All-Big Seven Conference football team
 1955 All-Big Ten Conference football team
 1955 All-Pacific Coast Conference football team
 1955 All-SEC football team
 1955 All-Southwest Conference football team

References

All-America Team
College Football All-America Teams